Concept is the ninth album by the Los Angeles, California-based R&B group the Sylvers.

Reception

Released in October 1981, this would be their only album for SOLAR Records label.  It also reunited them with older brother and former member Leon Sylvers III as he was working for SOLAR at the time.

The album's two singles were not as successful, with "Come Back, Lover, Come Back" reaching #63 on Billboard's dance singles chart and "Take It to the Top" failing to chart.

Track listing
"Reach Out"  (Charmaine Sylvers, Nidra Beard) – 6:14
"Come Back Lover, Come Back"  (Nidra Beard, Stephen Shockley, William Shelby) – 5:00
"Just When I Thought It Was Over"  (Glen Barbee, Joey Gallo, Otis Stokes)– 4:37
"Take It to the Top"  (Charmaine Sylvers) – 4:29
"I'm Getting Over"  (Kevin Spencer, Nidra Beard, William Shelby) – 4:20
"Taking Over"  (Charmaine Sylvers, Dana Meyers) – 3:55
"P.S. (The Unfinished Letter)"  (Dana Meyers) – 4:08
"Heart Repair Man"  (Karen Elliot) – 5:05
"There's a Place"  (Julius Johnsen, Karen Elliot) – 3:40

Personnel
The Sylvers – vocals, background vocals
Leon Sylvers III – bass, vocals
Foster Sylvers – bass, percussion
James Sylvers – keyboards
Ricky Sylvers – keyboards, guitar
Patricia Sylvers – keyboards
Ed Greene, Fred Alexander, Melvin Gentry, Wardell Potts – drums
Ernest "Pepper" Reed, Richard Randolph, Stephen Shockley – guitar
William Simmons, Bo Watson, Joey Gallo, Kevin Spencer, Lawrence Hilton-Jacobs, Norman Beavers, Rickey Smith, Sylvester Rivers – keyboards
Kenny Hudson – percussion

References

External links
 Concept at Discogs

1981 albums
The Sylvers albums
SOLAR Records albums
Albums produced by Leon Sylvers III